Lieutenant General Hon John Ramsay (21 April 1775 - 28 June 1842) was a British army officer and briefly a Member of Parliament.

Ramsay was the fourth son of George Ramsay, 8th Earl of Dalhousie. His brother was William Maule.

He became an Ensign by purchase in the 9th Regiment of Foot 1793, transferring to be a Lieutenant in Captain Marlay’s Independent Company of Foot later that year, and transferring to the 57th Regiment of Foot also in 1793. He became a Captain in the 100th Regiment of Foot in 1794. He was wounded in 1799 at the Battle of Krabbendam

He was promoted to Major in the Regiment (now renumbered the 92nd) in 1803. On half-pay with the Clanalpine fencibles, he was appointed a Lieutenant Colonel in 1810, brevet Colonel in 1819 and to an unattached commission as Lieutenant Colonel in 1830. He was Colonel of the 79th Regiment of Foot (Cameron Highlanders) from 1841 until his death. He was appointed a Lieutenant General in November 1841.

He served as Member of Parliament for Aberdeen Burghs from 1806 until 1807.

References

External links
 

1775 births
1842 deaths
18th-century Scottish people
19th-century Scottish people
People from Aberdeenshire
Members of the Parliament of Great Britain for Scottish constituencies
Members of the Parliament of the United Kingdom for Scottish constituencies
Politics of Aberdeenshire
UK MPs 1806–1807